Canadian Forces Base Bagotville , commonly referred to as CFB Bagotville, and also known as Bagotville Airport or Saguenay-Bagotville Airport,  is a Canadian Forces base located  west of Bagotville in the city of Saguenay. Its primary RCAF lodger unit is 3 Wing, commonly referred to as 3 Wing Bagotville.

CFB Bagotville's airfield is also used by civilian aircraft, with civilian operations at the base referring to the facility as Saguenay-Bagotville Airport. The airport is classified as an airport of entry by Nav Canada and is staffed by the Canada Border Services Agency (CBSA). CBSA officers can handle civilian aircraft with no more than 30 passengers between 0800-1630 on weekdays.

As of July 2019, the base commander is Colonel Normand Gagné.

As of 2018, approximately 1,700 military and civilian people work at CFB Bagotville.

History

World War II (1941–1945)
At the height of the Second World War, the RCAF selected a relatively level farming area at the head of navigable waters in the Saguenay River to be the site of several aerodromes during 1941. This area was considered useful for RCAF purposes, given the amount of cleared land in the region, its relative geographic isolation and proximity to the deepwater port of Port-Alfred, as well as access to the adjacent railway network. Construction began that summer and continued through the winter and following spring on RCAF Station St-Honoré near Chicoutimi and RCAF Station Bagotville in La Baie.

The base at St-Honoré opened in June 1942, followed by Bagotville on 17 July 1942; St-Honoré being operated as a sub-base to Bagotville. RCAF Station Bagotville hosted the 1 Operational Training Unit (1 OTU) which trained pilots from commonwealth nations under the British Commonwealth Air Training Plan (BCATP), as well as the 130 Panthère Squadron, which was an operational RCAF air defence unit intended to protect the massive Alcan aluminum smelter in nearby Arvida (one of the largest industrial facilities in Canada at the time), and associated hydro-electric facilities in the Saguenay region. During 1942 Quebec's coastal regions along the lower Saint Lawrence River and Gulf of Saint Lawrence were witnessing the Battle of the St. Lawrence as German U-boats were sinking Canadian shipping throughout the area. RCAF Station Bagotville was established, along with RCAF Station Mont-Joli to counter the U-boat menace to Canada's war effort and placate local fears.

Early training aircraft operating from RCAF Station Bagotville included Curtiss Kittyhawk, Westland Lysander, North American Harvard and Hawker Hurricane. 130 Squadron, which was deployed at the base to provide regional air defence to key industrial facilities, used the motto "Défendez le Saguenay", which was later adopted by the entire base. On 1 August 1942 the 12 Radar Detachment was deployed to provide air traffic control. On 24 October 1943 129 Squadron took over from 130 Squadron as the regional air defence unit; two months later in December 129 Squadron was redeployed from Saguenay and the 1 OTU was retasked with regional air defence duties.

Toward the end of the war, RCAF Station Bagotville began to decline in activity as the requirement for BCATP training decreased. On 28 October 1944 the 1 OTU ceased operations, followed by the 12 Radar Detachment. In 29 pilot training courses given by 1 OTU at RCAF Station Bagotville (and St-Honoré), 940 pilots successfully graduated and 41 were killed during training.

In November 1944 1 OTU was disbanded and the closure of RCAF Station Bagotville and its secondary facilities at RCAF Station St-Honoré was announced; they were closed and mothballed on 5 January 1945.

Aerodrome
Three runways were listed as follows:

Cold War (1951–1993)

The escalating tensions brought about by the Cold War and the Korean War saw RCAF Station Bagotville reactivated on 1 July 1951 as a training base for air defence squadrons deploying in support of NATO's defence of western Europe from the Warsaw Pact. Two squadrons, 413 and 414, initially trained at Bagotville using De Havilland Vampire and F-86 Sabre aircraft. On 7 March 1953 both squadrons deployed to Europe and the base was quiet through the rest of that year.

No. 431 (Fighter) Squadron re-formed at RCAF Station Bagotville on 18 January 1954 using the Sabre. The squadron was formed on a temporary basis until there were enough new CF-100s available to fulfill RCAF squadron needs and was deactivated on 1 October 1954. Also in 1954 432 and 440 squadrons were transferred to RCAF Station Bagotville flying the CF-100 Canuck all-weather fighter. In 1957 440 squadron deployed to RCAF Station Zweibrücken in West Germany and on 1 May 1957 413 squadron returned to the base flying the Canuck. That year also saw the CT-133 Silver Star arrive at the base as a training aircraft.

In 1961, 413 and 432 squadrons disbanded and 416 Squadron was formed at Bagotville flying the CF-101 Voodoo. 416 squadron was moved to RCAF Station Chatham the following year in 1962. In summer of 1962 the 425 Alouette squadron transferred to RCAF Station Bagotville flying the Voodoo; its aircraft were modified to carry the AIR-2 Genie - a nuclear-tipped air-to-air missile, with nuclear warheads being stored at Bagotville until the weapon's decommissioning in the early 1980s.
On 1 February 1968 the RCAF merged with the Royal Canadian Navy and Canadian Army to form the Canadian Armed Forces; RCAF Station Bagotville changed its name to Canadian Forces Base Bagotville.

Later that year 410 squadron formed at CFB Bagotville to provide training. In September 1969 433 "Porc-Épic" squadron was transferred to Bagotville flying the CF-116 Freedom Fighter. In 1982 410 squadron moved to CFB Cold Lake and was replaced by 434 "Bluenose" squadron.

On 1 July 1984 425 squadron changed from the CF-101 Voodoo to the CF-188 Hornet. On 9 July 1985 434 squadron moved to CFB Chatham. In 1986 433 squadron ceased operations to restructure and reactivated in January 1988 equipped with the CF-188 Hornet.

1993–present

On 1 April 1993 CFB Bagotville became home to 3 Wing, which administers all Air Command units on base. The same day 439 "Tiger" squadron was reformed from elements of the existing Base Flight Bagotville, flying the CT-133 Silver Star and CH-118 Huey. The CT-133 fleet was retired in 2001 and in 1996 439 squadron's four CH-118s were replaced by three CH-146 Griffons.

In July 1996, the base helped locals during the Saguenay flood.

On 1 March 1999, 12 Radar Squadron was formed at CFB Bagotville to provide tactical control of fighter/interceptor aircraft; it replaced a radar station at RCAF Station Mont Apica which was closed.

433 Squadron disbanded in 2006 with its aircraft and personnel absorbed by 425 Squadron as a dual language Francophone/Anglophone unit. The squadron was reactivated on 9 June 2015.

On October 2, 2020, the Government of Canada awarded EllisDon-EBC Inc. Joint Venture of Ottawa with the $12.1 million construction of new facilities to house the Royal Canadian Airforce's Future Fighter. The Future Fighter, to be housed at CFB Cold Lake and CFB Bagotville, will require facility upgrades before the first delivery of the fighter in 2025.

Present units 

Today CFB Bagotville has the following squadrons and units:

3 Wing Bagotville
No. 414 Squadron RCAF
425 Tactical Fighter Squadron (CF-18)
433 Tactical Fighter Squadron (CF-18)
439 Combat Support Squadron (search and rescue)
3 Operation Support Squadron
3 Mission Support Squadron
3 Air Maintenance Squadron
12 Radar Squadron
3 Wing Air Reserve Flight
Forward Operating Location Iqaluit

Bagotville also supports 414 Electronic Warfare Support Squadron. Reformed on 20 January 2009 this squadron is based in Ottawa and is composed of military Electronic Warfare Officers who fulfill the combat support role, flying on civilian contracted aircraft.

The Dassault/Dornier Alpha Jets that form part of Top Aces fleet are based here as part of the CF jet training program Contracted Airborne Training Services.

CFB Bagotville hosts the Bagotville Air Cadet Summer Training Centre. Air Cadets from across Canada attend the summer training centre to qualify in a variety of courses ranging from the one-week General Training Course, to the six-week Survival Instructor Course.

International commitments 

North American Aerospace Defense Command (NORAD)
NATO
UNO

Airlines and destinations

Museum 

The base is also home to the Musée de la Défense aérienne. A number of Canadian and foreign military aircraft are on static display outside of the main museum building.

International Air Show Bagotville 

Since 1953 the base has hosted an air show on a biannual schedule. The event is known as the International air show of Bagotville. Each air show showcases various military aircraft, including those of the Royal Canadian Air Force. The air show averages 100,000 visitors over the weekend.

References

External links

 Aéroport Saguenay-Bagotville
CFB Bagotville  Base presentation — Gouvernment of Canada

 
CFB Bagotville  Presentation on Bagotville selection — CAF Connection
 Air Defense Museum — CFB Bagotville

Canadian Forces bases in Quebec
Airports of the British Commonwealth Air Training Plan
Military airbases in Saguenay–Lac-Saint-Jean
Buildings and structures in Saguenay, Quebec
Transport in Saguenay, Quebec
Cadet Instructors Cadre (Canada)